Culkein Drumbeg (Scottish Gaelic: Cùl-cinn an Droma Bhig) is a remote village on the north west coast of Scotland.

It is a crofting and fishing village, and has a small jetty used by several fishing boats, pleasure boats, and fish farm boats.

Scenes of the short film, Zip 'n Zoo were filmed in Culkein Drumbeg.  Many residents appeared as extras.

External links
Drumbeg, Undiscovered Scotland
Photos of Culkein Drumbeg, Geograph Britain and Ireland

Populated places in Sutherland